AIA or A.I.A. or Aia may refer to:

Aia 
 Aia, a small town in the Basque province of Gipuzkoa, Spain
 Aia, current Kutaisi, ancient capital of Colchis
 Aia, another name for Aea (Malis), an ancient town in Greece
 Aia, the collected edition of E. C. Vivian's 1920s novels Fields of Sleep and People of the Darkness
Saint Aia (died c. 711), Belgian Catholic saint also known as Aye

Academia 
 Abstract Intelligent Agent, a generalization and a hypothetical essence of human intelligence
 Archaeological Institute of America
 Arizona Interscholastic Association
 Art Institute of Atlanta, a private fine-art college
 Association for Industrial Archaeology, a body supporting the archaeology of industry in Britain
 Artists' International Association

Statutes and treaties 
 Access to Information Act, a Canadian freedom of information act
 Leahy-Smith America Invents Act
 Anglo-Irish Agreement, a 1985 agreement between the governments of Ireland and the UK, aimed at bringing an end to The Troubles
 Anti-Injunction Act, a US federal law

Aerospace 
 Aerospace Industries Association
 American International Airways, now known as Kalitta Air
 Avies, an Estonian airline (ICAO code: AIA)

Airports
 Adelaide International Airport
 Alliance Municipal Airport in Alliance, Nebraska (IATA Code: AIA)
 Asuncion International Airport, in Luque, Asuncion, Paraguay
 Athens International Airport, serving Athens, the Greek capital
 Auckland Airport in Auckland, New Zealand

Sport and entertainment 
 Aliens in America, an American comedy TV show
 Arizona Interscholastic Association, an Arizona high school athletics association
 Asociación Iberoamericana de Atletismo, the governing body for the sport of athletics of European, Latin-American, and African countries with Iberian origin and/or Spanish or Portuguese language
 Athletes in Action, an evangelical sports ministry
 Autódromo Internacional do Algarve, a motor-racing track in Portugal

Business 
 American Insurance Association
 AIA Group, a Hong Kong insurance and finance corporation
 Amerindo Investment Advisors, a financial-services company
 Annual investment allowance, a type of capital allowance in accounting

Technology and engineering 
 Application Integration Architecture, an integration framework marketed by Oracle Corporation
 Atmospheric Imaging Assembly, an instrument that provides imaging of the Sun's corona on the Solar Dynamics Observatory
 Automated Imaging Association
 Authority Information Access

Professional bodies and qualifications 
 Alliance of Independent Authors
 American Institute of Architects
 Associate of the Institute of Actuaries
 Association of International Accountants
 Australian Institute of Architects
 Afghan Interim Administration

Other
 Anguilla, from its ISO 3-letter country code
 Air Intelligence Agency, the former name of the Air Force Intelligence, Surveillance and Reconnaissance Agency of the United States